Joe Riley (born 6 December 1996) is an English professional footballer who plays as a full-back or midfielder for  club Walsall.

Club career

Manchester United
Born in Blackpool, Lancashire, Riley joined Manchester United as a midfielder before being converted into a left-back for the under-21 team.

He was first included in a senior matchday squad on 18 February 2016,starting at left back as his team lost 2–1 away to Danish club Midtjylland in the last 32 of the UEFA Europa League. He made his senior debut four days later, when he came on as a half-time substitute for Cameron Borthwick-Jackson against Shrewsbury Town in the fifth round of 2015–16 FA Cup, a 3–0 win at New Meadow. On 25 February 2016, because of Chris Smalling's shoulder injury, Riley made his first start in a 5–1 home rout of Midtjylland in the UEFA Europa League, the same game Marcus Rashford made his debut.

Sheffield United (loan)
On 17 January 2017, Riley joined League One club Sheffield United on loan until the end of the 2016–17 season.

Bradford City
On 25 May 2018, Riley signed a two-year contract with Bradford City. On 26 May 2020 it was announced that he was one of 10 players who would leave Bradford City when their contract expired on 30 June 2020.

Carlisle United
On 5 August 2020, Riley joined League Two side Carlisle United on a one-year deal with an option of an additional year.

Walsall
On 13 June 2022, Riley joined Walsall on a two-year contract, active from 1 July upon the expiration of his contract with Carlisle.

Career statistics

References

External links

1996 births
Living people
English footballers
Sportspeople from Blackpool
Manchester United F.C. players
Sheffield United F.C. players
Bradford City A.F.C. players
Carlisle United F.C. players
Walsall F.C. players
Association football midfielders
English Football League players